Joseph Scott, also known as Dez Nado is an American hip hop and reggae singer, songwriter, and record producer from Jacksonville, Florida. He is also a television producer who produces and directs Jacksonville's first and only cable reality TV series, Life & Grind: Duval and LIVE from New Jax City, both of which air on north Florida/south Georgia's CW Network affiliate WCWJ/CW.

Career
Nado saw his earliest successes in college, where he used his platform as college DJ at a small university in Jacksonville to distribute and promote his music and host his own showcases on campus. After nearly being killed by a gunshot to the chest in 2009, he shifted the tone of his music from "self-destructive to self-productive" and started using his music as a platform for pushing a progressive agenda and promoting non-violence in one of the most violent cities in Florida. This new sound led to his first major digital distribution deal after releasing his first mixtape series, No Hands, which included No Hands, No Hands 1.5 and No Hands 2 distributed by KKR/Island/Def Jam and his most progressive work in response to his views on the Trayvon Martin shooting and the Stand Your Ground policy in his home state of Florida. No Hands 2 is distributed by MTV.

Nado premiered a cable reality TV series called Life & Grind: Duval on Bounce TV that looks into not only his daily life as an independent artist, but also other indie artists and bands affiliated with his self-managed entertainment label. After winning the title of Jacksonville Artist of the Year and performing at the 2015 BET Hip Hop Awards, Nado released his second mixtape album LaDolceVita in 2016 with Caskey, Taylor Gang artist Lola Monroe, and Fetty Wap. Nado made the local news before the mixtape album release and TV series premiere with his $1.4 Million dollar One Spark crowdfunding pitch in Spring 2014 for his Life & Grind project and northeast Florida's largest annual indie concert series Duval Spring Fest, which he started in college.

Life and Grind TV Series

The Life & Grind TV franchise has since the LaDolceVita album release expanded based on the show's popularity to include an Atlanta spin-off version of the Jacksonville show, the latter of which Dez signed on and agreed with the CW 17 Television Network to air 8 episodes on the larger CW affiliate WCWJ for season 4, reaching nearly 7 times the number of viewers as the previous seasons in addition to the 7,500+ viewer base on DeKalb-Comcast 25 (Atlanta). Dez attributed the growth of his buzz as an artist, evident in his 12,000+ units moved of his "Futuristic" single and tens of thousands of downloads/streams following the release of his latest single "Duele", to his growing independent cable television platform in one of his latest interviews with hip hop blog HipHopApproved.com. His events and music were praised by G-Unit Records and Def Jam. His third solo mixtape album LogophiliYaH is planned to be released in the fall of 2019 and accompanied by a spring and fall college tour supported by his TV platform.

Discography

Studio albums

Singles

As lead artist

References

External links
 Official website

African-American male rappers
Rappers from Florida
Living people
21st-century American rappers
Year of birth missing (living people)
21st-century African-American male singers